A. princeps may refer to:
 Accipiter princeps, the New Britain goshawk, a bird of prey species endemic to Papua New Guinea
 Actenoides princeps, the scaly-breasted kingfisher, a bird species endemic to Indonesia
 Anthene princeps, the cupreous hairtail, a butterfly species found in Africa
 Artemisia princeps, the Japanese mugwort, a perennial plant species found in Japan
 Attalea princeps, a palm species in the genus Attalea